The 2019-20 Princeton Tigers Men's ice hockey season was the 118th season of play for the program and the 59th season in the ECAC Hockey conference. The Tigers represented the Princeton University and played their home games at the Hobey Baker Memorial Rink, and were coached by Ron Fogarty, in his 6th season.

On March 12 ECAC Hockey announced that the remainder of the tournament was cancelled due to the COVID-19 pandemic.

Departures

Recruiting

Roster
As of July 10, 2019.

Standings

Schedule and Results

|-
!colspan=12 style=";" | Exhibition

|-
!colspan=12 style=";" | Regular Season

|-
!colspan=12 style=";" | 

|-
!colspan=12 style=";" | 

|- align="center" bgcolor="#e0e0e0"
|colspan=12|Princeton Won Series 2–0
|- align="center" bgcolor="#e0e0e0"
|colspan=12|Remainder of Tournament Cancelled

Scoring statistics

Goaltending statistics

Rankings

References

Princeton Tigers men's ice hockey seasons
Princeton Tigers
Princeton Tigers
2019 in sports in New Jersey
2020 in sports in New Jersey